"Esperanza" is a 1961 hit song by Charles Aznavour with French lyrics written by Aznavour after the original instrumental composition by Ramón Cabrera Argotes. The Aznavour version commences "Esperanza, esperanza, le bonheur en nos coeurs...".

The Spanish original also achieved popularity in its own right particularly the Spanish-language version by Nino de Murcia, but the French version of Aznavour was successful even in Spanish speaking countries.

Versions
António Machin
Digno Garcia 1970
Enrique Montoya 1959
Nino de Murcia 1961
Johnny Forsell, Finland 1962
Los Machucambos 1962
Los Matecoco 	1962
Ralf Carsten, German lyrics by Loose 1962
Manuel de Gomez y su Orquesta Tipica 1963
Ping Ping (Al Verlane and his Montebello's) 1962
Orchestre Des Champs Elysées 1966
Les Scarlet 
Charlie Level et Les Carnaval's 
Didier Boland et L'Orchestre Des Rois Avec Les "Gilles Choeurs" PBM  France

References

1961 songs
Charles Aznavour songs
Songs written by Charles Aznavour
Cuban songs
Spanish-language songs
French-language songs